Bembecia megillaeformis is a moth of the family Sesiidae. It is found in central and south-eastern Europe, east to Turkey, Uralsk, the Crimea and the Black Sea.

Adults are on wing from June to August.

The larvae feed on Genista tinctoria, Genista ratisbonensis, Cytisus hirsutus, Colutea arborescens, Chamaecytisus, Astragalus glycyphyllos and Corothamus procumbens.

Subspecies
Bembecia megillaeformis megillaeformis (Germany, Slovakia, Austria, Hungary, Romania, Croatia, Italy, southern Russia, Uralsk, Crimea, Black Sea)
Bembecia megillaeformis luqueti Špatenka, 1992 (France: Brittany, Loire Valley)

References

Moths described in 1813
Sesiidae
Moths of Europe
Moths of Asia